The Family Mahone is an English folk rock band from Chester, England.  The radio DJ Mark Radcliffe is a member.

Discography
Songs of the Back Bar (1999)
On the Razzle with the Family Mahone (2002)
Mahone Brew (April 2006)

English folk rock groups
People from Chester